Coon Rapids High School (CRHS) is a public high school in Coon Rapids, Minnesota, United States. It is part of the Anoka-Hennepin School District 11 and participates in the University of Minnesota's College in the Schools program.

Academics
The Coon Rapids Center for Biomedical Sciences and Engineering program is a specialty program within the school. The program was launched in 2013 and consists of hands-on math, science, medical, and engineering courses using Project Lead the Way curriculum.

Students can enroll in college-level courses through Post Secondary Enrollment Options (PSEO). This program allows high school students to experience college coursework without paying college tuition fees. General education coursework is available to grades 11 and 12, and technical education coursework is available to grades 10, 11, and 12.

Athletics
Coon Rapids is part of the Northwest Suburban Conference and a member of the Minnesota State High School League (MSHSL).

Notable alumni 
 Tom Copa, professional basketball player
 Branden Petersen, politician
 Logan Shore, MLB player
 Zack Stephenson, politician and state representative

References

External links 
 

Schools in Anoka County, Minnesota
Public high schools in Minnesota